Kyaukpadaung is a town in Mandalay Region in Central Myanmar. It lies just south-west of Mount Popa. It is the administrative seat for Kyaukpadaung Township.

History
The name of Kyaukpadaung is derived from Kyauk (Rock) + Pann (Flower) + Taung (Basket).

Kyaukpadaung is also known as the city of Jaggery

Geography
Since the name of this town is related to rock. There are some rocky hills nearby and in town. The extinct Vocalno Mount Popa is about 16 kilometres from town.

Rock Climbing

Close to rail way station, there is a rock climbing and bouldering site.

Transportation
Rail transport has been established since World War II, on the Pyinmana-Kyini Link. Buses and cars operate to and fro nearby townships. Kyaukpadaung is situated on the link road of Yangon-Myingyan-Mandalay road  and Yangon-Meiktila-Mandalay.

Communication
In 1994, telephone system was upgraded, from Manual Switching Exchange to Auto Telephone System. Local Area Code is 061, it was same as Chauk.

Weather
Kyaukpadaung is located in Hot & Dry zone, and rain measure getting about 40 inch and below. Temperature during Summer: High=36~39'C, Low= 25~28'C, and Winter: High=30~31'C, Low=19~23'C. Popa region is an oasis in central Myanmar.

References

External links
Satellite map at Maplandia.com

Township capitals of Myanmar
Populated places in Mandalay Region